Antepione imitata is a moth of the family Geometridae first described by Henry Edwards in 1884. It is known from western Texas, Colorado and New Mexico to southern Arizona and is probably also found in northern Mexico. It is generally associated with riparian canyons up to 1,830 meters.

The wingspan is 35–37 mm. There are three generations per year in south-eastern Arizona and south-western New Mexico. There is a strong early flight starting in April and early May, with a weaker flight in late June into July, and another strong flight beginning in mid-August after the monsoonal rains with a few individuals into early October.

The larvae have been recorded on Ribes aureum.

External links
 A revision of the genus Antepione Packard with description of the new genus Pionenta Ferris (Lepidoptera, Geometridae, Ennominae)

Ourapterygini
Moths of North America